News Time Bangla is a 24-hour Bengali news channel launched in 2010. In 2011 they broadcast the 33rd Federation cup held in Kolkata.

See also
International broadcasting
List of Indian television stations
24-hour television news channels

External links

 

24-hour television news channels in India
Television channels and stations established in 2010
Bengali-language television channels in India
Television stations in Kolkata
2010 establishments in West Bengal